Nakielno  is a village in the administrative district of Gmina Wałcz, within Wałcz County, West Pomeranian Voivodeship, in north-western Poland.

This was formerly the town of Klein Nakel, in the German province of West Prussia.  The population was expelled by the Poles and Russians.

References

Nakielno